is a railway station on the Nippō Main Line operated by JR Kyushu in Usa, Ōita, Japan.

Lines

Layout 
The station, which is unstaffed, consists of two side platforms serving two tracks. Both tracks run on the east side of their respective platforms. There is no station building, only shelters on both platforms for waiting passengers. Each platform has its separate entrance and there is no link within the station premises. To cross from one platform to the next, it is necessary to use an underpass located some distance from the station entrance.

Adjacent stations

History
Japanese Government Railways (JGR) opened Nishiyashiki Signal Box on 1 September 1926 as an additional facility on the existing track of the Nippō Main Line. On 1 March 1947, Japanese National Railways (JNR), the postwar successor of JGR, upgraded the facility to a full station. With the privatization of JNR on 1 April 1987, the station came under the control of JR Kyushu.

Passenger statistics
In fiscal 2015, there were a total of 4,713 boarding passengers, giving a daily average of 13 passengers.

See also
List of railway stations in Japan

References

External links

  

Railway stations in Ōita Prefecture
Railway stations in Japan opened in 1947